The Forest Hills disaster (also called the Forest Ridge disaster and the Bussey Bridge train disaster) was a railroad bridge accident that occurred on March 14, 1887, in the Roslindale section of Boston, Massachusetts.

Disaster
A morning commuter train, inbound to Boston, was passing over the Bussey Bridge, a Howe truss, at South Street in the Roslindale neighborhood a half mile from the Forest Hills station, when it suddenly collapsed, sending several cars crashing to the street below.  Thirty-eight commuters were killed and another 40 were seriously injured.

The train, made up of nine cars, was traveling over the Dedham Branch of the Boston & Providence Railroad on a sunny Monday morning with about 300 passengers, including several school children.  Six miles from Boston, the train crossed over the Bussey Bridge on its approach to the Forest Hills Station.  The locomotive and first two cars crossed the bridge and then suddenly, without any warning, the bridge fell, taking the third, fourth, fifth, and sixth cars with it.  The shock of the collapse was so quick and forceful that the body of one of the cars fell and its roof tore off completely and landed on the embankment beyond the bridge.

The disaster shocked the entire nation, especially the suffering of the injured, some of whom were transfixed by splinters throughout their bodies and others dismembered and yet others badly mangled.  The first body that rescuers pulled from the wreck was that of a headless woman.  Two young men were pinned under a pile of rubble with a car stove full of glowing coals hanging over them.  Fortunately, the doors of the stove stayed closed and the bolts held firmly and they were rescued.

Investigation
An investigation found that the iron bridge design was poor; it was not strong enough to carry the load of traffic it had to serve.  Its designer, Edmund Hewins, was exposed as a fraud. Investigators found that the railroad had also failed to inspect and properly maintain the bridge, even though nuts and bolts were discovered which had fallen from the bridge and were lying on the street below.

References

External links
Bussey Bridge Wreck, 1887 - Celebrate Boston

Railway accidents in 1887
Railway accidents and incidents in Massachusetts
Bridge disasters in the United States
Bridge disasters caused by engineering error
Bridge disasters caused by maintenance error
MBTA Commuter Rail
19th century in Boston
1887 in Massachusetts
Accidents and incidents involving Boston and Providence Railroad
March 1887 events
Disasters in Boston